Lloyd Harvard Kincaid (May 8, 1925November 1, 2007) was an American politician who served as a member of the Wisconsin State Assembly and the Wisconsin State Senate.

Early life
Kincaid was born on May 8, 1925, in Sault Ste. Marie, Michigan. He graduated from high school in Crandon, Wisconsin.  At age 18, 1943, he enlisted in the United States Army for service in World War II.  After returning from the war, Kincaid worked as a cabinetmaker and grocer.

Political career 
From 1970 to 1973, he was a member of the Board of Directors of Nicolet Area Technical College, the city council of Crandon, Wisconsin, and a member of the Forest County Board of Supervisors.

In 1972, he was elected to his first term in the Wisconsin Legislature, when he was elected to represent the 36th district in the Wisconsin State Assembly.  Though originally elected as a Republican, and re-elected twice on the Republican ticket, in the middle of his third term, Kincaid switched parties and became a conservative Democrat.  He was disappointed with the way the Republican caucus had handled legislative negotiations over a change to the mining tax.  After his party-switch, he was re-elected three more times, including his narrow 1982 victory over fellow-incumbent Earl W. Schmidt, with whom he had been forced into a confrontation due to redistricting.

Shortly after the 1982 election, on December 15, 1982, incumbent state senator Clifford Krueger announced he would retire at the end of the year.  Kincaid won the April 1983 special election to fill the remainder of Krueger's term and was subsequently re-elected in 1984 and 1988.

Kincaid remained a member of the Senate until June 1990, when he resigned for health reasons.

Personal life 
Kincaid and his wife Kathleen were married for 55 years.  They had three sons and one daughter, and, at the time of his death, he had nine grandchildren and six great grandchildren.  He was a member of the American Legion and active in his local church.

He died on November 1, 2007, at his home in Crandon, Wisconsin.

References

External links
The Political Graveyard

|-

American cabinetmakers
People from Sault Ste. Marie, Michigan
People from Crandon, Wisconsin
Democratic Party Wisconsin state senators
Democratic Party members of the Wisconsin State Assembly
Wisconsin city council members
County supervisors in Wisconsin
Military personnel from Wisconsin
Military personnel from Michigan
United States Army personnel of World War II
1925 births
2007 deaths
20th-century American politicians